This article lists the confirmed squads for the 2019 Men's EuroHockey Nations Championship tournament held in Antwerp, Belgium between 16 and 24 August 2019. The eight national teams were required to register a playing squad of eighteen players and two reserves.

Age, caps and club for each player are as of 16 August 2019, the first day of the tournament.

Pool A

Belgium
The squad was announced on 7 August 2019.

Head coach:  Shane McLeod

England
The squad was announced on 7 August 2019.

Head coach: Danny Kerry

Spain
The squad was announced on 7 August 2019.

Head coach:  Frederic Soyez

Wales
The squad was announced on 1 August 2019.

Head coach: Zak Jones

Pool B

Germany
The squad was announced on 27 July 2019. Malte Hellwig replaced Marco Miltkau due to an injury.

Head coach: Stefan Kermas

Ireland
The squad was announced on 30 July 2019.

Head coach:  Alexander Cox

Netherlands
The squad was announced on 29 July 2019.

Head coach:  Maximiliano Caldas

Scotland
The squad was announced on 12 August 2019.

Head coach: Derek Forsyth

References

Squads
EuroHockey Nations Championship squads